This is a list of flag bearers who have represented Gabon at the Olympics.

Flag bearers carry the national flag of their country at the opening ceremony of the Olympic Games.

See also
Gabon at the Olympics

References

Flag bearers
Gabon
Olympic flagbearers